The Workday Charity Open was a professional golf tournament on the PGA Tour played in 2020, intended to serve as a one-time replacement for the John Deere Classic, which was cancelled due to the COVID-19 pandemic. The tournament was played at Muirfield Village in Dublin, Ohio, the week before the Memorial Tournament, hosted at the same venue. Spectators were not allowed due to the ongoing pandemic.

Collin Morikawa won the tournament in a sudden-death playoff against Justin Thomas; both players tied at 269 (19 under par) after 72 holes, before Morikawa secured victory with a par on the third extra hole.

Winners

Notes

References

External links
Coverage on the PGA Tour's official site
  

PGA Tour events
Golf in Ohio
Sports in Dublin, Ohio
2020 establishments in Ohio